Collecting duct carcinoma (CDC) is a type of kidney cancer that originates in the papillary duct of the kidney.  It is rare, accounting for 1-3% of all kidney cancers.  It is also recently described;  a 2002 review found just 40 case reports worldwide. Previously, due to its location, CDC was commonly diagnosed as renal cell carcinoma or a subtype of renal cell carcinoma.  However, CDC does not respond well to chemotherapy drugs used for renal cell carcinoma, and progresses and spreads more quickly.

Signs and symptoms
Signs and symptoms are as for kidney cancer.

Histology
Histologic examination of collecting duct carcinoma demonstrates an infiltrative lesion with tubulopapillary, irregular channels lined by high grade hobnail cells with marked desmoplastic response and brisk neutrophilic infiltrate.

Treatment

History
CDC was thought to be renal cell carcinoma, until "recently developed techniques of lectin histochemistry" helped forward knowledge of kidney duct cancers.

References

External links 

Rare cancers
Kidney cancer